FK 11 Oktomvri is a football club from Prilep, North Macedonia. They recently played in the Macedonian Third League.

History
The club was founded in 1951.

In the 2010–11 season, they won the Macedonian Second League title with manager Nikolce Zdravevski and were promoted to the Macedonian First League for the first time in club history. Unfortunately, they lasted only one season in the top tier.

Honours
Macedonian Second League:
Winners (1): 2010–11

References

External links
Official Website 
Club info at MacedonianFootball 
Football Federation of Macedonia 

 
Football clubs in Prilep
Association football clubs established in 1951
1951 establishments in the Socialist Republic of Macedonia